Fushitsusha (不失者) is a Japanese rock band specialising in experimental and psychedelic rock genres. The band consists of electric guitarist and singer Keiji Haino, and a shifting cast of complementary musicians. The group released the majority of its material in the 1990s.

History
Haino formed Fushitsusha in 1978, although their first LP was not released until 1989. The band initially consisted of Haino on guitar and vocals, and Tamio Shiraishi on synthesizer. After the departure of Shiraishi, Ayuo joined briefly in 1979 before Fushitsusha became a trio with the addition of Jun Hamano (bass) and Shuhei Takashima (drums). The lineup soon changed, adding Yasushi Ozawa (bass) and Jun Kosugi (drums) throughout the 1990s.  Their 1993 album Allegorical Misunderstanding was released on John Zorn's record label, Avant, although most of their albums have come out on independent label PSF and on major label Tokuma.

Fushitsusha recently returned to duo status, with Haino supplementing percussion with tape loops, though the band is believed to have been on hiatus since 2001.

In February 2008, longtime bassist Yasushi Ozawa died.

In August 2015, bassist Chiyo Kamekawa was dismissed because he plays in another band MANNERS.
Later, Yasumune Morishige joined as a bassist.

In 2018, Mitsuru Nasuno joined as a bassist.

Music
The band's sound is influenced by German krautrock bands of the 1970s and British psychedelic music of the 1960s and 1970s.  They are generally considered part of the Japanese psychedelic music scene alongside bands like Ghost and Acid Mothers Temple.  Their music occasionally ventures to the more aggressive "Japanoise" end of the sonic spectrum, but usually remains haunting and contemplative.

Discography

Studio albums

Live albums

Filmography
 1991.9.26 – VHS (1992) (Reissued on DVD, 2006)

References

 Official (Japanese)
 Unofficial (English)
 [ Biography at Allmusic]
 Interview with Fushitsusha 
 Fushitsusha discography
 Another Fushitsusha discography
 Forced Exposure page
 Video of Fushitsusha

Space rock musical groups
Japanese experimental rock groups
Japanese psychedelic rock music groups
Blast First artists
Musical groups from Tokyo
Tokuma Japan Communications artists
P.S.F. Records artists
Utech Records artists